Fados 67 is a fado album recorded by Amália Rodrigues and released on the Columbia label (SPMX 5006). It was reissued in 2018 with additional material included on three compact discs.

Track listing
Side A
 Maldição	
 Pedro Gaiteiro	
 Primavera	
 Não É Tarde	
 Fria Claridade	
 A Julia Florista

Side B
 Meu Nome Sabe-Me A Areia	
 Um Fado Nasce	
 Olhos Fechados	
 Carmencita	
 Fado Das Tamanquinhas	
 Há Festa Na Mouraria

References

1967 albums
Amália Rodrigues albums